Hoima is a city in the Western Region of Uganda. It is the main municipal, administrative, and commercial center of Hoima District. It is also the location of the palace of the Omukama of Bunyoro.

Location
The coordinates of Hoima City are 1°25'55.0"N 31°21'09.0"E (Latitude:1.431944; Longitude:31.352500).

Population
According to the 2002 national census, the population of Hoima was enumerated at 60,561. In August 2014, the national population census put Hoima's population at 100,099. In 2020, the Uganda Bureau of Statistics (UBOS) estimated the mid-year population of the city at 122,700. UBOS calculated the population growth of Hoima to average 3.54 percent annually between 2014 and 2020.

Economic activity
Between 2000 and 2009, a considerable amount of oil deposits, estimated at between 2.5 billion to 3.5 billion barrels, were discovered in Lake Albert and on the shores of the lake in Hoima District and the neighboring Buliisa District. An oil pipeline, the Uganda-Tanzania Crude Oil Pipeline, is also planned to evacuate crude oil to the Tanzanian Indian Ocean port of Tanga. Consequently, Hoima is poised to become a hub of economic activity.

The first phase of construction, including the runway and cargo-handling facilities, is expected to be ready in 2020. This phase is primarily to support construction of the oil refinery. The second phase of construction, focused on the facilitation of passengers and boosting tourism and business, is expected to conclude in 2022. The project is expected to create about 1,000 jobs.

Because of the increased economic activity in the area, Hoima has been upgraded to municipality status, with increased infrastructure to handle the new businesses and new residents. Land prices, rental rates, and other real estate costs in Hoima have gone up recently, as demand for real estate in the town and surrounding areas has increased.

Transport
The city will be served by Hoima International Airport which is currently under construction and expected to be completed by December 2023.

Points of interest
The following additional points of interest are found within the city limits or close to its edges: (a) Orukurato rw'Obukama bwa Bunyoro-Kitara (Bunyoro-Kitara Kingdom parliament
(b) Ekikaali Kya (Kings palace of) Karuziika
(c) Western campus of Gulu University
(d) the headquarters of Hoima District Administration
(e) offices of Hoima City Council
(f) a branch of the National Social Security Fund (g) Hoima Regional Referral Hospital, a 268-bed public hospital administered by the Uganda Ministry of Health.

See also
Bunyoro sub-region
List of cities and towns in Uganda

References

External links

   of Land Set Aside for Oil Refinery
Hoima Rapidly Becoming A Large Metropolis
 Oil Brings New Facelift To Hoima
 Hoima: The Nectar Attracting A Bevy of New Businesses

Populated places in Western Region, Uganda
Cities in the Great Rift Valley
Hoima District
Bunyoro sub-region
Hoima